James Mulinge Munandi Ndeto (born 25 January 1981), commonly known as Mulinge Ndeto, is a Kenyan footballer who plays for Kenyan Premier League side Ulinzi Stars as a defender. He previously played for K.C.B. and Tusker. He also appeared for the Kenya national team, and was part of the squad that won the 2013 CECAFA Cup.

References

External links
 
 

1981 births
Living people
Kenyan Premier League players
Kenya Commercial Bank S.C. players
Tusker F.C. players
Ulinzi Stars F.C. players
Kenyan footballers
Kenya international footballers
Association football defenders